Cuero High School is a public high school located in Cuero, Texas, United States and classified as a 4A school by the University Interscholastic League (UIL). It is part of the Cuero Independent School District located in central DeWitt County.   In 2015, the school was rated "Met Standard" by the Texas Education Agency.

Athletics
The Cuero Gobblers compete in these sports - 

Cross Country, Volleyball, Football, Basketball, Powerlifting, Golf, Tennis, Track, Softball & Baseball

State titles
Football - 
1973(3A), 1974(3A), 1987(3A), 2018(4A)
Boys Track - 
1988(3A), 2005(3A), 2006(3A), 2008(3A)

Notable alumni

Cody Wallace, NFL player
Henry Sheppard, NFL player
Alois Blackwell, NFL player
Arthur Whittington, NFL player
Dr. Fred Hansen, 1964 Olympic Gold Medalist in Pole Vault

References

External links
 

Schools in DeWitt County, Texas
Public high schools in Texas